Crocodeta variegata is a moth of the family Erebidae first described by Walter Rothschild in 1913. It is found in Papua New Guinea.

References

Moths described in 1912
Erebid moths of Asia
Moths of Papua New Guinea
Nudariina